Townsend's vole (Microtus townsendii) is a species of rodent in the family Cricetidae, the sister species of M. canicaudus. It is found in temperate grasslands of British Columbia in Canada and in the states of Washington and Oregon in the United States.

Greek root words for "small ear" are the source for the genus name Microtus. American naturalist and writer John Kirk Townsend collected the type specimen in 1835, which accounts for the second part of the name.

Description
The ears are wide and prominent, being clearly visible above the fur, which is thin and coarse. The upper surface is dark brown with many guard hairs with black tips and the underparts are paler. The feet are slate grey and the tail is blackish above and dark brown beneath. Juveniles are generally darker than adults with dark grey underparts and black tails and feet.

Distribution and habitat
Townsend's vole is found in the extreme west of North America. Its range extends from Vancouver Island, British Columbia southwards through Washington state and Oregon to Humboldt Bay in California. These voles typically live in wet meadows, marshes, flood plains, wet areas with rank vegetation and salt marshes.

The population can become extremely dense, so that it impacts or excludes other species.  Their proliferation rate makes them a good source of food for many species.

Biology
Townsend's vole lives in a burrow system and creates runways among the vegetation in its habitat. In the summer the voles may take advantage of the denser cover available and also move about elsewhere. Feces are deposited in the runways and large latrines may form, often at intersections. Nests may be built on the surface of the ground or on hummocks, and this allows the vole to live in seasonally-flooded areas where its burrows are sometimes underwater. Both underground and surface nests are made of grasses.

Townsend's vole feeds on soft green plant material such as rushes, tules, grasses, sedges, horsetails, clovers, alfalfa, blue-eyed grass and purple-eyed grass. They also store the bulbous roots of American wild mint, consuming them during the winter even though plenty of succulent green food is available at that time.

Breeding takes place between February and October. The gestation period is about 23 days and the litter size ranges from one to nine young with an average of four, larger females usually having larger litters. The offspring are weaned at about sixteen days of age.

Status
Townsend's vole has a wide range and undergoes large swings in population. Over the long term, the population seems to be steady and in some localities this vole is very plentiful, having been recorded at densities as high as eight hundred individuals per hectare. No particular threats to this species have been recognised; the International Union for Conservation of Nature assessed its conservation status as being of "least concern".

References

Citations

Sources

Further reading

External links

Microtus
Mammals described in 1839
Taxonomy articles created by Polbot
Taxa named by John Bachman